The Hamer Ministry was the 59th ministry of the Government of Victoria. It was led by the Premier of Victoria, Rupert Hamer, of the Liberal Party. The ministry was sworn in on 24 August 1972.

Portfolios

References

Victoria (Australia) ministries
Liberal Party of Australia ministries in Victoria (Australia)
Ministries of Elizabeth II